The Edward Waldo House is a historic house museum at 96 Waldo Road in Scotland, Connecticut. Built about 1715, it is a well-preserved example of colonial residential architecture, which was occupied by a single family for over 250 years. The house was listed on the National Register of Historic Places in 1978.  It is now owned by the local historical society.

Description and history
The Edward Waldo House is located in far southern Scotland, on the north side of Waldo Road, which serves as the town line with Sprague.  The  property on which it stands extends across the road into Sprague.  It is a two-story wood-frame vernacular house, with a gabled roof, central chimney, and clapboarded exterior.  The main facade is five bays wide, with symmetrically placed windows around a center entrance.  The entrance is simply trimmed, with a modest entablature and cornice above.  Windows on the second floor are smaller than those on the first, and butt against the eave.  A series of additions extend from the rear of the house.  The interior retains a number of period features, including a built-in cabinet in one of the parlors, wide floorboards, and a paneled staircase in the entry vestibule.

The house was built about 1715 by Edward Waldo, on land that he had purchased in 1702. Waldo was a farmer and deacon of the Congregational church in Scotland. He and his wife Thankful had ten children. Among his descendants were residents of the house that included Daniel Waldo, a Chaplain of the United States House of Representatives, and the portrait artist Samuel Lovett Waldo.

The Waldo house was first to be built in what is now Scotland, but was then part of Windham. It was occupied by six generations of the Waldo family before being given to the Scotland Historical Society in 1971, complete with its contents. The society has turned the house into a museum.

See also
List of the oldest buildings in Connecticut
National Register of Historic Places listings in New London County, Connecticut
National Register of Historic Places listings in Windham County, Connecticut

References

External links

Edward Waldo House- Visiting information
Scotland Connecticut Highland Games

Houses on the National Register of Historic Places in Connecticut
Houses completed in 1715
Saltbox architecture in Connecticut
Scotland, Connecticut
Houses in Windham County, Connecticut
Historic house museums in Connecticut
Museums in Windham County, Connecticut
National Register of Historic Places in Windham County, Connecticut
National Register of Historic Places in New London County, Connecticut
1715 establishments in the Thirteen Colonies